Homelands may refer to:

 Homeland, native lands
 Homelands (festival), British dance music festival.
 Homelands (Fables), mythical lands in the comic book series Fables.
 Homelands (Magic: The Gathering), MTG expansion set.
 Bantustan, part of the Apartheid system
 The Homelands, football fields in Kingsnorth, England.
 Homelanders, the generation following the Millennials.

See also 
 Homeland (disambiguation)